Pavel Shavrov (born 29 January 1971) is a retired Belarusian professional footballer and Belarus international. He was a top scorer of Belarusian Premier League in 1994–95 season.

Honours
Dinamo-93 Minsk
Belarusian Cup winner: 1994–95

Dinamo Minsk
Belarusian Premier League champion: 1997

Individual
Belarusian Premier League top scorer: 1994–95

External links
 
 Profile at teams.by

1971 births
Living people
Belarusian footballers
Association football forwards
Belarus international footballers
FC Gomel players
FC Dinamo-93 Minsk players
FC Dinamo Minsk players
FC Shakhtyor Soligorsk players
FC Molodechno players
FC Rudziensk players
FC Baranovichi players
FC Neman Stolbtsy players
Belarusian Premier League players